This is a list of Azerbaijan football transfers in the summer transfer window, 03 August-05 October 2020, by club. Only clubs of the 2020–21 Azerbaijan Premier League are included.

Azerbaijan Premier League 2020-21

Gabala

In:

Out:

Keşla

In:

Out:

Neftchi Baku

In:

Out:

Qarabağ

In:

Out:

Sabah

In:

Out:

Sabail

In:

Out:

Sumgayit

In:

Out:

Zira

In:

Out:

References

Azerbaijan
Azerbaijani football transfer lists
2020–21 in Azerbaijani football